Wolfe Island Wind Farm is a large wind farm project located on Wolfe Island, Ontario (near Kingston, Ontario). The wind farm became operational on June 29, 2009. It is owned and operated by Canadian Hydro Developers, Inc., through its subsidiary Canadian Renewable Energy Corporation (CREC). The power will be purchased by Hydro One for distribution to consumers.

The wind farm consists of eighty-six 2.3-megawatt (MW) Siemens model Mark II wind turbines situated on the western portion of Wolfe Island.

Once completed, the 197.8 MW project was expected to generate approximately 594 gigawatt-hours (GW·h) of renewable power annually; enough to supply about 75,000 average households. Over its first four full years of operation, generation proved to be around 495 GWh annually (see below).

Key project components

padmount transformers at the base of each wind turbine
access roads
a 34.5-kilovolt (kV) electrical line collector system
a 34.5 / 230 kV transformer station
a 230 kV electrical line system provided by Nexans
 230 kV interconnection facilities with the provincial grid at Hydro One's Gardiners Transformer Station
an operations and maintenance building.

CREC has optioned a total of approximately 2513 hectares (6,209 acres) of land for the proposed wind development.

The facility will provide green jobs and generate landowner and community income through royalties, taxes, and the amenities agreement. Canadian Hydro has built a visitor centre at its property on the 5th line.

The 2010 Bird and Bat report commissioned by Transalta, a component of the Post Construction Follow-up Plan (PCFP), states that over the first six months of operation bird mortality due to blade strike was 602 birds of which 13 were raptors.  That reflects 6.99 birds per turbine over six months (almost 14 strikes per turbine per year).  The industry standard for comparable wind facilities is generally 2 bird strikes per turbine per year.  Over 1270 bats were killed in the same six-month period.  The development is in a globally and continentally significant Important Bird Area.  The PCFP was designed in response to stakeholder concerns over potential negative effects on bird populations, and is a partnership between Transalta, the Environment Canada and provincial Ministry of Natural Resources.

Production

See also 

 List of wind farms in Canada
 List of onshore wind farms
 List of offshore wind farms

References

External links

 Newsletters
 Independent Electricity System Operator (IESO) website
Power Being Generated in Ontario by Site

Buildings and structures in Frontenac County
Wind farms in Ontario